Cytochrome P450 17A1 (steroid 17α-monooxygenase, 17α-hydroxylase, 17-alpha-hydroxylase, 17,20-lyase, 17,20-desmolase) is an enzyme of the hydroxylase type that in humans is encoded by the CYP17A1 gene on chromosome 10. It is ubiquitously expressed in many tissues and cell types, including the zona reticularis and zona fasciculata of the adrenal cortex as well as gonadal tissues. It has both 17α-hydroxylase and 17,20-lyase activities, and is a key enzyme in the steroidogenic pathway that produces progestins, mineralocorticoids, glucocorticoids, androgens, and estrogens. More specifically, the enzyme acts upon pregnenolone and progesterone to add a hydroxyl (-OH) group at carbon 17 position (C17) of the steroid D ring (the 17α-hydroxylase activity), or acts upon 17α-hydroxyprogesterone and 17α-hydroxypregnenolone to split the side-chain off the steroid nucleus (the 17,20-lyase activity).

Structure

Gene
The CYP17A1 gene resides on chromosome 10 at the band 10q24.3 and contains 8 exons. The cDNA of this gene spans a length of 1527 bp. This gene encodes a member of the cytochrome P450 superfamily of enzymes. The cytochrome P450 proteins are generally regarded as monooxygenases that catalyze many reactions involved in drug metabolism and synthesis of cholesterol, steroids, and other lipids, including the remarkable carbon-carbon bond scission catalyzed by this enzyme. 

The CYP17A1 gene may also contain variants associated with increased risk of coronary artery disease.

Protein
CYP17A1 is a 57.4 kDa protein that belongs to the cytochrome P450 family. The protein encoded by its cDNA is composed of 508 amino acid residues. As an enzyme, CYP17A1 possesses an active site that associates with a heme prosthetic group to catalyze biosynthetic reactions. Based on its known structures while bound to two steroidal inhibitors, abiraterone and galeterone, CYP17A1 possesses the canonical cytochrome P450 fold present in other complex P450 enzymes that participate in steroidogenesis or cholesterol metabolism, though it orients the steroid ligands toward the F and G helices, perpendicular to the heme group, rather than the β1 sheet.

Expression
Expression of CYP17A1 has been found in all of the traditional steroidogenic tissues except the placenta, including the zona reticularis and zona fasciculata of the adrenal cortex, the Leydig cells of the testes, the thecal cells of the ovaries, and, more recently, in luteinized granulosa cells in ovarian follicles. In addition to classical steroidogenic tissue, CYP17A1 has also been detected in the heart, kidney, and adipose tissue. In the fetus, CYP17A1 has been reported in the kidney, thymus, and spleen.

Function
CYP17A1 is a member of the cytochrome P450 superfamily of enzymes localized in the endoplasmic reticulum. Proteins in this family are monooxygenases that catalyze synthesis of cholesterol, steroids and other lipids and are involved in drug metabolism. CYP17A1 has both 17α-hydroxylase activity and 17,20-lyase activity. The 17α-hydroxylase activity of CYP17A1 is required for the generation of glucocorticoids such as cortisol, but both the hydroxylase and 17,20-lyase activities of CYP17A1 are required for the production of androgenic and oestrogenic sex steroids by converting 17α-hydroxypregnenolone to dehydroepiandrosterone (DHEA). Mutations in this gene are associated with isolated steroid-17α-hydroxylase deficiency, 17α-hydroxylase/17,20-lyase deficiency, pseudohermaphroditism, and adrenal hyperplasia.

Furthermore, the 17,20-lyase activity is dependent on cytochrome P450 oxidoreductase (POR) cytochrome b5 (CYB5) and phosphorylation. Cytochrome b5 acts as a facilitator for 17,20 lyase activity of CYP17A1 and can donate a second electron to some P450s. In humans the production of testosterone via pregnenolone to17-OHPreg and DHEA by the CYP17A1 requires POR. Human CYP17A1 protein is phosphorylated on serine and threonine residues by a cAMP-dependent protein kinase. Phosphorylation of the protein increases 17,20-lyase activity, while dephosphorylation virtually eliminates this activity.

Clinical significance
Mutations in this gene are associated with rare forms of congenital adrenal hyperplasia, specifically 17α-hydroxylase deficiency/17,20-lyase deficiency and isolated 17,20-lyase deficiency.

In humans, the CYP17A1 gene is largely associated with endocrine effects and steroid hormone metabolism. Furthermore, mutations in the CYP17A1 gene are associated with rare forms of congenital adrenal hyperplasia, in particular 17α-hydroxylase deficiency/17,20-lyase deficiency and isolated 17,20-lyase deficiency. Overall, CYP17A1 is an important target for inhibition in the treatment of prostate cancer because it produces androgen that is required for tumor cell growth. The decreased enzyme activity of CYP17A1 is related to infertility due to hypogonadotropic hypogonadism. In females, folliculogenesis is arrested, while in males, testicular atrophy with interstitial cell proliferation and arrested spermatogenesis. Although generally anovulatory, there are some case reports of women with 17α-hydroxylase deficiency who underwent spontaneous menarche with cyclic menses.

Clinical marker
A multi-locus genetic risk score study based on a combination of 27 loci, including the CYP17A1 gene, identified individuals at increased risk for both incident and recurrent coronary artery disease events, as well as an enhanced clinical benefit from statin therapy. The study was based on a community cohort study (the Malmo Diet and Cancer study) and four additional randomized controlled trials of primary prevention cohorts (JUPITER and ASCOT) and secondary prevention cohorts (CARE and PROVE IT-TIMI 22).

As a drug target

CYP17A1 inhibitors

Currently, the FDA has approved only one CYP17A1 inhibitor, abiraterone, which contains a steroidal scaffold that is similar to the endogenous CYP17A1 substrates. Abiraterone is structurally similar to the substrates of other cytochrome P450 enzymes involved in steroidogenesis, and interference can pose a liability in terms of side effects. Using nonsteroidal scaffolds is expected to enable the design of compounds that interact more selectively with CYP17A1. Potent inhibitors of the CYP17A1 enzyme provide a last line defense against ectopic androgenesis in advanced prostate cancer.

The drug abiraterone acetate, which is used to treat castration-resistant prostate cancer, blocks the biosynthesis of androgens by inhibiting the CYP17A1 enzyme. Abiraterone acetate binds in the active site of the enzyme and coordinates the heme iron through its pyridine nitrogen, mimicking the substrate.

Since 2014, galeterone has been in phase III clinical trials for castration-resistant prostate cancer.

Ketoconazole is an older CYP17A1 inhibitor that is now little used. However, ketoconazole competitively inhibits CYP17A1, therefore its effectiveness will depend on the concentration of ketoconazole. This is in contrast to the abiraterone acetate, that permanently (rather than competitively) disables CYP17A1, once it binds to it.

Seviteronel (VT-464) is a novel CYP17A1 inhibitor which is aimed to avoid co-administration of glucocortoid therapy. In the 2010s it underwent various phases of clinical studies and preclinical models as a drug against prostate cancer or breast cancer.

Steroidogenesis

Additional images

See also

 Steroidogenic enzyme
 Cytochrome P450 oxidoreductase deficiency

References

Further reading

External links
 
 

17